Point of Entry may refer to: 

 Point of Entry, a 1981 album by Judas Priest
 Point of Entry (audio drama), a Doctor Who audio drama
 Point of Entry (2007 film), a 2007 Lifetime television film starring Holly Marie Combs (renamed Panic Button)
 Point of Entry (TV series), a Singaporean TV series produced by MediaCorp Channel 5
 Entry Point, A Roblox game developed by Freefall Softworks

See also 
 Entry point, in computer programming, a memory address
 Port of entry, a place where one may lawfully enter a country